Yuji Iwasawa (岩沢雄司; born 4 June 1954) is a Japanese jurist. He has been a member of the International Court of Justice since 22 June 2018, following the resignation of Judge Hisashi Owada. He was re-elected on 12 November 2020. He formerly chaired the United Nations Human Rights Committee.

References

1954 births
Living people
Japanese jurists
University of Tokyo alumni
Harvard Law School alumni
University of Virginia School of Law alumni
International Court of Justice judges